Itamba Ganesh is a village in Piro block of Bhojpur district, Bihar, India. It is located southeast of Piro. As of 2011, its population was 856, in 128 households.

References 

Villages in Bhojpur district, India